Kilspindie is a village in Perth and Kinross, Scotland. Records show there was a chapel in the village since at least 1214 though the current church, the Kilspindie and Rait Parish Church, was built in 1670 and refurbished in 1938. The village previously housed the Kilspindie Castle which was demolished before 1670.

In the Ordnance Gazetteer of Scotland (1882–84) Francis Groome described Kilspindie:

The village is twinned with Fléac in France.

References

Villages in Perth and Kinross